Mariana Vassileva is a Bulgarian born (born 1964) visual artist living and working in Germany. Her works covers the fields of photography, drawing, sculpture and video.

Biography
Mariana Vassileva was born in 1964 in Antonovo. She studied pedagogy at Veliko Tarnovo University and art at the Hochschule der Künste Berlin. Mariana Vassileva currently lives and works in Berlin.

Public collections
Kunsthalle Emden
Kunstmuseum Wolfsburg
La Colección de Arte Contemporáneo del Ayuntamiento de Pamplona
Museum for Contemporary Art Scopje
Sofia City Art Gallery
The Israel Museum, Jerusalem

Bibliography
Mariana Vassileva, Solo video 2000-2012, Casal Solleric, Febrer-April 2012, 
Komm und sieh, Sammlung von Kelterborn, HatjeCantz, 
Garten Eden: Die Gärten in der Kunst seit 1900, DuMont 2007,

References

External links
Mariana Vassileva - Works DNA Gallery. 
Artist profile. 
Artist talk at NCCA Saint Petersburg, 2014
Picture of Mariana Vassileva's Milk Maid used to promote Loop Barcelona festival
Bulgarian national television

1964 births
Living people
Bulgarian artists
Bulgarian sculptors
Artists from Berlin
New media artists
German artists
Video artists
Bulgarian women artists
20th-century Bulgarian artists
21st-century Bulgarian artists
20th-century sculptors
21st-century sculptors
20th-century German women artists
21st-century German women artists